Keraudrenia nephrosperma is a shrub of the family Malvaceae native to northwestern Australia.

References

nephrosperma
Plants described in 1863
Eudicots of Western Australia
Taxa named by Ferdinand von Mueller